Flora Ugwunwa (born 26 June 1984) is a Nigerian Paralympic athlete competing in F54-classification events. She represented Nigeria at the 2016 Summer Paralympics held in Rio de Janeiro, Brazil and she won the gold medal in the women's javelin throw F54 event. She also set a new world record of 20.25m at this event.

She represented Nigeria at the 2020 Summer Paralympics in Tokyo, Japan after winning the silver medal in the women's javelin throw F54 event at the 2019 World Para Athletics Championships held in Dubai, United Arab Emirates. She also competed in the women's shot put F54 event where she finished in 6th place.

References

External links 
 

Living people
1984 births
Place of birth missing (living people)
Athletes (track and field) at the 2016 Summer Paralympics
Athletes (track and field) at the 2020 Summer Paralympics
Medalists at the 2016 Summer Paralympics
Paralympic gold medalists for Nigeria
Paralympic medalists in athletics (track and field)
Paralympic athletes of Nigeria
African Games medalists in athletics (track and field)
Athletes (track and field) at the 2015 African Games
African Games gold medalists for Nigeria
African Games silver medalists for Nigeria
Nigerian javelin throwers
Nigerian female discus throwers
Nigerian female shot putters
Wheelchair discus throwers
Wheelchair shot putters
Wheelchair javelin throwers
Paralympic discus throwers
Paralympic javelin throwers
Paralympic shot putters
20th-century Nigerian women
21st-century Nigerian women